Platea Madrid is a gourmet food hall on the Plaza de Colón in Madrid. It is located in a former cinema and employs ca. 380 people. Mexican, Peruvian, Italian, and various Asian cuisines are offered as well as Michelin star restaurateurs Paco Roncero (of restaurant La Terraza del Casino, Madrid), Pepe Solla (Solla, Galicia) and Marcos Morán (Casa Gerardo, Asturias).

References

External links

Official website (English version)

Food halls
Retail markets in Spain
Buildings and structures in Madrid
Restaurants in Madrid